Kari Løvaas (born 13 May 1939) is a Norwegian operatic soprano who made an international career outside Scandinavia, mostly using the German spelling of her name, Kari Lövaas. She has performed at international festivals such as the Salzburg Festival and the Lucerne Festival in both opera and concert. She participated in complete recordings of rarely performed operas, including works by Haydn and composers of the 20th century, has recorded Lieder and has regularly appeared in choral concerts.

Career 
Løvaas grew up at Brekkeparken in Skien where she also had one of her first appearances. In 1955, she was accepted by the Oslo Conservatory of Music, aged 16, studying under the mentorship of Ingeborg Vorbeck. She made her opera debut as "Nuri" in Eugen d'Albert's Tiefland in the opening performance at the Norwegian National Opera and Ballet on 16 February 1959 on the recommendation of Kirsten Flagstad who had sung the same role for her debut. She was then offered the role of Pamina in Mozart's The Magic Flute at the Norwegian Opera and appeared in two productions.

After her performance in the role of Pamina she was awarded a government scholarship, and traveled to Vienna where she studied at the Musikakademie in 1960–63.

She had a permanent position at the Dortmund Opera (1963/64), followed by the Mainz Opera (to 1966). Later, she had guest roles at several operas in Scandinavia, including in Oslo in 1966. She performed at major opera houses in Europe and international festivals. At the Salzburg Festival, she appeared in 1969 as Marianne Leitmetzerin in Der Rosenkavalier by Richard Strauss, and in 1970 as Barbarina in Mozart's The Marriage of Figaro in a production by Günther Rennert, conducted by Karl Böhm. On 20 August 1973, she was one of the sybils in the premiere of Carl Orff's De temporum fine comoedia at the Salzburg Festival, conducted by Herbert von Karajan, which was recorded. She sang the same year the soprano solo in Rossini's Petite messe solennelle at the Münchner Festwochen, and the Lucerne Festival, with Wolfgang Sawallisch as the pianist and conductor, alongside Brigitte Fassbaender, Peter Schreier and Dietrich Fischer-Dieskau. The performance had been recorded live the previous year at the Baumburg Abbey. In 1973, she appeared in her first Wagner role, as Sieglinde in Die Walküre at the Zurich Opera. She appeared as Forzana in a performance of Wagner's Die Feen at the Münchner Opernfestspiele of 1983, conducted by Sawallisch and recorded. She also performed at festivals in Vienna, Bergen, the Ludwigsburg Festival and the Schwetzingen Festival, and at festivals and operas in the US, Australia and Japan.

Løvaas has sung numerous operatic roles, including Euridice in Gluck's Orfeo ed Euridice, Micaela in Bizet's Carmen, Tatjana in Tchaikovsky's Eugen Onegin and Mimi in Puccini's La bohème. She has also performed songs by Bach, Handel, Mozart and Beethoven. She sang regularly as a soloist in concerts with the Wiener Singverein, conducted by Walter Hornsteiner, such as Bach's Mass in B minor at the Stiftskirche Reichersberg, Franz Schmidt's The Book with Seven Seals at the Niederaltaich Abbey, and Bruckner's Te Deum in Passau Cathedral.

In recordings of complete operas, she performed several parts in rarely recorded works. In 1971, she appeared as Louise in Lortzing's Die Opernprobe, conducted by Otmar Suitner. She sang Haydn operas with Antal Doráti, Diana in La fedeltà premiata in 1975, and Baroness Irene in La vera costanza a year later. A reviewer noted of her performance of a dramatic aria in the latter work that "she shows her excellent range and instinct for theatrical combustibility". She sang the part of Laura in Weber's Die drei Pintos in 1976, conducted by Gary Bertini, and performed a title role in Othmar Schoeck's Vom Fischer und syner Fru in 1977, conducted by Rudolf Kempe. She sang the part of Die Rothaarige in Werner Egk's Peer Gynt in 1981, conducted by Heinz Wallberg, and the part of Iole in Lou Harrison's Hercules in 1984, conducted by Dieter Hauschild. She recorded Lieder by Grieg, Sibelius and Richard Strauss with the Berliner Symphoniker. She has also recorded Alban Berg's "Sieben frühe Lieder" in the orchestral version with the NDR orchestra conducted by Herbert Blomstedt available on DG.

By the 1990s, Løvaas lived in Switzerland.

See also
Haydn: La fedeltà premiata (Antal Doráti recording)

References

External links 
 Kari Løvaas (1939)  Music History Archives
 Kari Lövaas, Discogs
 Bruce Duffie, "Soprano  Kari  Lövaas - A Conversation with Bruce Duffie, 22 February 1996
 Kari Lövaas Theaterfreunde Mainz

20th-century Norwegian women opera singers
Norwegian sopranos
Musicians from Skien
1939 births
Living people
Oslo Conservatory of Music alumni
Norwegian expatriates in Germany
Norwegian expatriates in Austria
Norwegian expatriates in Switzerland
University of Music and Performing Arts Vienna alumni